Charles Emmanuel III (27 April 1701 – 20 February 1773) was Duke of Savoy and King of Sardinia from 1730 until his death.

Biography

He was born in Turin to Victor Amadeus II of Savoy and his first wife the French Anne Marie d'Orléans. His maternal grandparents were Prince Philippe of France and his first wife Princess Henrietta, the youngest daughter of Charles I of England and Henrietta Maria of France. Charles Emmanuel was the oldest surviving brother of Princess Maria Adelaide of Savoy - the mother of Louis XV of France; he was also the brother of Maria Luisa of Savoy, Queen of Spain as wife Philip V of Spain.

At the time of his birth, when he was known as Duke of Aosta, Charles Emmanuel was not the heir to Savoy; his older brother Victor Amadeus, Prince of Piedmont, was the heir apparent. Charles Emmanuel was the second of three sons that would be born to his parents. His older brother died in 1715 and Charles Emmanuel then became heir apparent.

As a result of his aid in the War of the Spanish Succession, Victor Amadeus II was made king of Sicily in 1713 under the Treaty of Utrecht which ended the war. Victor Amadeus was forced to exchange Sicily for the less important kingdom of Sardinia in 1720 after objections from an alliance of four nations, including some of his former allies. 

On 3 September 1730, Victor Amadeus who, in his later years had exhibited reticence and melancholy, abdicated the throne and retired from the royal court. His son became King Charles Emanuel III. He had not been a favorite of his father's, who had neglected his education except on the military field, where the son had sometimes accompanied the father.

After some time spent at his residence in Chambéry, however, the former king started to intervene in his son's government. Victor Amadeus reclaimed the throne, accusing his son of incompetence. He established himself in Moncalieri, but Charles Emmanuel managed to have the former king arrested by the Crown Council, in order to prevent him from attacking Milan and probably causing an invasion of Piedmont. Victor Amadeus was then confined to the Castle of Rivoli, where he later died without further interference with his son's regime.

The War of Polish Succession

In the War of the Polish Succession Charles Emmanuel sided with the French- backed king Stanislaw I. After the treaty of alliance signed in Turin, on 28 October 1733 he marched on Milan and occupied Lombardy without significant losses. However, when France tried to convince Philip V of Spain to join the coalition, he asked to receive Milan and Mantua in exchange. This was not acceptable for Charles Emmanuel, as it would recreate a Spanish domination in Italy as it had been in the previous centuries. While negotiations continued about the matter, the Savoy-French-Spanish troops attacked Mantua under the supreme command of Charles Emmanuel himself.

The War of the Austrian Succession
Sure that in the end Mantua would be assigned to Spain, he voluntarily thwarted the expedition. The Franco-Piedmontese army was victorious in two battles at Crocetta and Guastalla. In the end, when Austria and France signed a peace, Charles was forced to leave Lombardy. In exchange, he was given some territories, including Langhe, Tortona and Novara.

War of the Austrian Succession

Charles Emmanuel sided with Maria Theresa of Austria in the War of the Austrian Succession, receiving financial and naval support from Great Britain and the Dutch Republic. After noteworthy but inconclusive initial successes, he had to face the French-Spanish invasion of Savoy and, after a failed allied attempt to conquer the Kingdom of Naples, the County of Nice. When the enemy army invaded Piedmont, in 1744 he personally defended Cuneo against the Spanish-French besiegers. The following year, with some 20,000 men, he was faced with an invasion of two armies with a total of some 60,000 troops. The important strongholds of Alessandria, Asti and Casale fell. In 1746, after receiving reinforcements from Austria, he was able to recapture Alessandria and Asti. In 1747, he obtained a crushing victory over the French at the Battle of Assietta, and his territories were saved when the main battleground moved northwards to the Netherlands.

The outcome was the Treaty of Aix-la-Chapelle, which revealed his qualities as a negotiator, inasmuch as he both regained the lost provinces of Nice and Savoy, and obtained Vigevano as well as other lands in the Pianura Padana. Ties with Spain were reestablished with the marriage of his son Prince Victor Amadeus to the Infanta Maria Antonia Ferdinanda of Spain in 1750.

He declined to participate in the Seven Years' War (1756–63), preferring to concentrate on administrative reforms, maintaining a well-disciplined army and strengthening his fortresses. In an attempt to improve the poor condition of the newly acquired Sardinia, he also restored the Universities of Sassari and Cagliari.

Charles Emmanuel died in Turin in 1773. He was buried in the Basilica of Superga.

Art collector
Charles Emmanuel's ancestors were avid art collectors.  He added many new paintings to the collection he inherited from his ancestors. He also received paintings from the collection of Prince Eugene of Savoy who had remained childless. The collection contained many works of Flemish and Dutch painters. As a result, the Sabauda Gallery in Turin was the largest collection in Italy of 16th and 17th century Flemish and Dutch paintings. In 1731 he established a tapestry workshop in Turin. The Flemish battle painter Jan Peeter Verdussen was his court painter and painted many of his military victories.

Marriages and issue
Charles Emmanuel married three times, but all of his three wives died young. There were plans for him to marry his cousin Charlotte Aglaé d'Orléans, but his mother declined the offer. Amalia d'Este, daughter of Rinaldo, Duke of Modena, and Infanta Francisca Josefa of Portugal, daughter of Pedro II of Portugal, were also candidates.

Countess Palatine Anne Christine of Sulzbach (1704–1723), daughter of Theodore Eustace of Sulzbach and Princess Maria Eleonore of Hesse-Rheinfels-Rotenburg. She died a few days later after giving birth to a son:
Prince Vittorio Amedeo Theodore of Savoy (1723–1725) died in infancy;

Princess Polyxena of Hesse-Rheinfels-Rotenburg (1706–1735) She was the daughter of Ernest Leopold, Landgrave of Hesse-Rheinfels-Rotenburg (maternal uncle of his first spouse) and his wife Maria Anna of Löwenstein-Wertheim-Rochefort. Polyxena bore him six children:
Victor Amadeus III of Sardinia (1726–1796); married Infanta Maria Antonietta of Spain and had issue. They were the ancestors of Henri, Count of Chambord;
Princess Eleonora Maria Teresa of Savoy (1728–1781), unmarried.
Princess Maria Luisa Gabriella of Savoy (1729-d.1767), a nun.
Princess Maria Felicita of Savoy (1730–1801), unmarried.
Prince Emanuele Filiberto of Savoy, Duke of Aosta (1731–1735) died in infancy;
Prince Carlo Francesco Romualdo of Savoy, Duke of Chablais (1733-1733) died in infancy;
Princess Elisabeth Thérèse of Lorraine (1711–1741) daughter of Leopold, Duke of Lorraine and his wife Élisabeth Charlotte d'Orléans, a niece of Louis XIV of France). Elisabeth Thérèse was a younger sister of Francis I, Holy Roman Emperor, the husband of Empress Maria Theresa of Austria. The couple married in 1737, and Elisabeth Thérèse bore him three children:
Prince Carlo Francesco of Savoy, Duke of Aosta (1738–1745) died in childhood;
Princess Maria Vittoria Margherita of Savoy (1740–1742) died in infancy;
Prince Benedetto of Savoy (1741–1808), Duke of Chablais (-1796) and Marquis of Ivrea (1796–1808). He married his niece Princess Maria Ana of Savoy (1757–1824), daughter of  Victor Amadeus III of Sardinia, no issue.

Ancestry

References

Bibliography
 

1701 births
1773 deaths
18th-century kings of Sardinia
Nobility from Turin
Claimant Kings of Jerusalem
Princes of Savoy
Dukes of Aosta
18th-century Dukes of Savoy
Princes of Piedmont
Italian military personnel of the War of the Polish Succession
Military personnel from Turin